Kykkos Monastery ( or  [] for short), which lies 20 km west of Pedoulas, is one of the wealthiest and best-known monasteries in Cyprus.

The Holy Monastery of the Virgin of Kykkos was founded around the end of the 11th century by the Byzantine emperor Alexios I Komnenos (1081–1118). The monastery lies at an altitude of 1318 meters on the north west face of Troödos Mountains. There are no remains of the original monastery as it was burned down many times. The first President of Cyprus, Archbishop Makarios III started his ecclesiastical career there as a monk in 1926. He remained fond of the place and returned there many times. His request to be buried there materialised after his death in 1977. His tomb lies 3 km west of Kykkos monastery and remains a popular visitor destination.

History

According to tradition, that was written by the Ukrainian pilgrim, Vasil Grigorovich-Barsky, who travelled to Kykkos Monastery in 1735, a virtuous hermit called Esaias was living in a cave on the mountain of Kykkos. One day, the Byzantine governor of the island, doux Manuel Boutoumites, who was spending the summer at a village of Marathasa because of the heat of the season, went into the forest to hunt. Having lost his way in the forest he met Monk Esaias and asked him to show him the way. The hermit who was not interested in the things of this world would not answer his questions.

Boutoumites got angry at the monk's indifference and called him names and even maltreated him. Not long after, when the doux returned to Nicosia, he fell ill with an incurable illness by the name of lethargia. In his terrible condition he remembered how inhumanly he had treated the hermit Esaias and asked God to cure him so that he might go to ask the hermit personally for forgiveness. And this came to pass. But God had appeared in front of the hermit and revealed to him that the very thing that had happened had been planned by the divine will and advised him to ask Boutoumites to bring the icon of the Virgin, that had been painted by the Apostle Luke, to Cyprus.

The icon was kept in the imperial palace at Constantinople. When Boutoumites heard the hermit's wish he was taken aback because he considered such a thing impossible. Then Esaias explained to him that it was a matter of divine wish and they agreed to travel together to Constantinople for the realization of their aim.

Time was passing and Boutoumites could not find the right opportunity to present himself in front of the emperor and ask for the icon. For this reason he provided Esaias with other icons and other necessary things and sent him back to Cyprus, at the same time placating him that he would soon see the emperor. By divine dispensation the daughter of the emperor had fallen ill with the same illness that had struck Boutoumites. The latter grasped the opportunity and went to see the Emperor Alexios III Angelos. He recounted to him his personal experience with the monk Esaias and assured him that his daughter would be cured if he sent to Cyprus the holy icon of the Virgin. In his desperation the emperor, seeing that he had no other option, agreed. His daughter became well instantly. The emperor, however, not wanting to be parted from the icon of the Virgin, called a first-class painter and ordered him to paint an exact copy of the icon with the aim of sending this one to Cyprus.

In the evening the Mother of God herself appears in a dream of the emperor's and tells him that her wish is for her icon to be sent to Cyprus and for the copy to be kept by the emperor. On the following day the royal boat with the icon of the Virgin departed for Cyprus where Esaias was awaiting for it. During the procession of the icon from the coast to the Troödos Mountains, according to legend, the trees, participating in the welcoming ceremonies, were piously bending their trunks and branches. With patronage provided by the emperor Alexios Komnenos a church and monastery were built at Kykkos, where the icon of the Virgin was deposited.

According to another tradition, still preserved by the people, a bird with human voice was flying around the area singing:
Kykkou, Kykkou, Kykkos' hill
A monastery the site shall fill
A golden girl shall enter in
And never shall come out again

The "golden girl" is, without a doubt, the icon of the Virgin while the monastery is the Holy Royal and Stauropegial Monastery of Kykkos which has been sheltering the icon for over nine hundred years.

The church of the Monastery was destroyed three times in its history. The current church dates from 1745.

The icon of Virgin Mary

Throughout the centuries locals have revered the icon and have attributed miracles to its presence. In 1760 a success in the struggle against locust devastation, a frequent problem of the time, was believed to be the work of the icon. The icon has also served as a template for other paintings depicting the Madonna in eastern Orthodoxy.
The icon is never looked at, and its top half remains hidden behind a protective covering as it is said that whoever looks at it will be blinded. The last person to have seen the icon is the Pope and Patriarch of Alexandria Gerasimos, in 1669. The icon is rarely uncovered, although this happens on occasion. In recent years there had been a drought affecting Cyprus, in response to which the fathers took the icon to her throne, and read special supplications for rain, whilst looking away from the uncovered icon.

Other relics
There are placed to the right of the icon a bronze arm, and a sword fish saw. Regarding the arm, this serves as a reminder the story of a Turk who tried to light a cigarette using one of the vigil lamps and he was cursed and suffered a gangrenous arm. The saw from the sword fish represents the gratefulness of sailors who prayed to Our Lady of Kykkos to save them from the storms of the sea.

Metochion Kykkou
Kykkos monastery maintains separate grounds Engomi, Nicosia called Metochi tou Kykkou (Μετόχι του Κύκκου). The land on which it lies was acquired over the years by the monastery through bequests. With the city's rapid expansion, the area which once used to be in the outskirts has now become prime property. Despite this, much of it is still used for agricultural purposes. Up until the construction of its purpose built premises, the Cyprus State Fair was held on these grounds.

In 1974, whilst Archbishop Makarios was under pursuit by the military junta, he headed for refuge here. As a result, the building was hit by tank fire and part of it collapsed. When he died subsequently, he was buried on the grounds.

Metropolitanate
The current abbot, Nikephoros, whose symbol is the bee, was made a bishop. His proper title is "Right Reverend Metropolitan of Kykkos and Tillyria Monsigneur Nikephoros". He stood for election to become Archbishop of Cyprus.

References

External links

 Official Kykko Monastery Website
The Kykko Monastery Museum (English)
Museum of Kykkos Monastery
Kykkos Portal
 3-D Virtual reality panoramic views of cloister and gallery mosaics
 Icon of Virgin Kykkotissa

Cypriot Orthodox monasteries
Greek Orthodox monasteries
Christian monasteries established in the 11th century
Historic sites in Cyprus
Alexios I Komnenos
Eastern Orthodox church buildings dedicated to Theotokos
Paphos District
Troodos Mountains